The 1979 Ottawa Rough Riders finished in 2nd place in the Eastern Conference with an 8–6–2 record. Prior to the 2015 season, the 1979 season was the last time that an Ottawa-based CFL team had a winning season.

In May 1979, Tom Clements was traded to the Saskatchewan Roughriders. The Clements-Holloway quarterback combination would be no more. From 1975–78, under Holloway and Clements, the Rough Riders compiled a 38–24–2 record, which included two Eastern Division championships and a Grey Cup win in 1976 over Saskatchewan. This lent to the credence of the "two number-ones" stratagem and both quarterbacks' team-first attitude.

Preseason

Regular season

Standings

Schedule

Postseason

Player stats

Passing

Receiving

Awards and honours
 Ron Foxx, Linebacker, CFL All-Star
 Tony Gabriel, Tight End, CFL All-Star

References

Ottawa Rough Riders seasons
1979 Canadian Football League season by team